Phillip LaDon Phillips Jr. (born September 20, 1990) is an American singer-songwriter who rose to fame after winning the eleventh season of American Idol on May 23, 2012. His coronation song, "Home", became the best-selling song in American Idol history.

His debut album The World from the Side of the Moon was released on November 19, 2012, and was on the Billboard Top 200 album chart for 61 weeks.  It has been certified Platinum by the RIAA. The album included the single "Gone, Gone, Gone."  He followed up with Behind the Light, in 2014 with the lead single "Raging Fire." His third album, Collateral, was released in 2018 and included the songs "Into the Wild" and "Magnetic." Phillips toured with John Mayer, Gavin DeGraw, the Goo Goo Dolls and has shared the stage with Bruce Springsteen.

In the United States, Phillips has sold 7.5 million digital singles and has sold 2.7 million albums including album streaming equivalent units.  He has over 700 million streams on Spotify and 1.2 billion streams on Pandora.

Early life
Phillip Phillips was born in Albany, Georgia, to Sheryl (Jacks) and Phillip LaDon "Donnie" Phillips, Sr. He moved with his family to Leesburg, Georgia when he was 12. He has two older sisters, LaDonna, the eldest, and Lacey. Phillips grew up in Sasser and Leesburg, and attended Lee County High School. He graduated from Albany Technical College with a major in Industrial Systems Technology, but missed the graduation ceremony due to his obligations to American Idol. Prior to appearing on American Idol, he worked at his family's pawn shop.

Phillips started playing music, particularly the guitar, when he was 14. He was mentored by his long-time friend and brother-in-law, Benjamin Neil, whom he credits for piquing his interest in music. In 2009, he formed the Phillip Phillips Band with Neil and another brother-in-law, Todd Urick, and performed in various local venues and events. He won a local singing competition, "Albany Star," in 2010.

Phillips' favorite singer is Jonny Lang. Other favorites include John Butler, Dave Matthews, and Damien Rice. He also enjoyed Mumford & Sons and Tool. He grew up listening mainly to '60s and '70s music such as Jimi Hendrix and Led Zeppelin; "Then as I got older I found Damien Rice and Dave Matthews and John Butler, which is what really set it off for me in terms of finding my voice as a musician."  He has described his music as "jazz and rock alternative sound."

Prior to trying out for American Idol, Phillips also auditioned on the second season of America's Got Talent.

American Idol

Overview
Phillip Phillips auditioned in Savannah, Georgia. He sang "Superstition" by Stevie Wonder. One of the show's executive producers, Megan Michaels-Wolflick, stated "I remember the day in Savannah in 2011 when Phillip Phillips walked in the room and I thought, "This guy is going to win this season." As he walked in front of American Idol judges for his initial audition, Steven Tyler whispered to Jennifer Lopez, "I got a funny feeling about this." The judges asked him to perform a second song with his guitar, and he performed Michael Jackson's "Thriller." He advanced to the Hollywood rounds, and later to the Las Vegas round.

On February 23, 2012, Phillips was chosen as one of the Top 25 semi-finalists, and was voted into the Top 13.

His performance style on the show has been compared to Dave Matthews, and he covered one of his songs, "The Stone," in the competition. When asked about Phillips' imitation of his style, Dave Matthews said: "More power to him, I don't mind," and added "He should kick my ass, [then] maybe I can retire and he can take over my band." Mentor Stevie Nicks said Phillips would have been good enough to join Fleetwood Mac back in 1975, after his performance of Jonny Lang's "Still Rainin," for which he received a standing ovation from the judges.

After the Top 13 performance night, Phillips was taken to a doctor for possible kidney stones. He had eight procedures while he was performing on Idol, and considered quitting the show due to the pain.

For his Top 3 performance, Phillips sang Bob Seger's "We've Got Tonight." For Top 4, he did a cover of Damien Rice's "Volcano" - which has been heralded as one of the best American Idol performances of all time. As the sole contestant who was never in jeopardy of elimination in any week of the competition, Phillips became the winner on the finale against Jessica Sanchez after a record-breaking 132 million votes were cast. His coronation song, "Home," was released after his performance, and had the biggest digital sales week for any Idol winner's coronation song.

Phillips said, "It was crazy and it changed my life completely. I didn't know what to expect, I just loved playing music." "It never seemed like a competition. I always made sure I was having fun and the band was having a good time."

Career

After winning American Idol, Phillip Phillips went on the American Idol LIVE Tour from July to September with the rest of the top ten finalists.  He performed the National Anthem at the opening game of the 2012 World Series on October 24, 2012. On November 15, he joined forces with the PS22 chorus of Staten Island for a concert to raise money for those affected by Hurricane Sandy. He also performed at the National Christmas Tree Lighting Ceremony on December 6, 2012.

Phillips' coronation song, "Home", was a great success with sales of over 5 million copies in the US. It has been used in NBC's coverage of the Olympics, L.A. Marathon, various commercials, film trailers, and TV shows.  He performed "Home" on the PBS Independence Day celebration TV special, A Capitol Fourth.  He appeared at the 83rd MLB All-Star Game held at Kansas City on July 10 and sang his coronation song.  On October 9, 2012, he joined other musicians in the One World concert held in Syracuse University to honor the Dalai Lama. He also performed "Home" on the CNN Heroes special aired on December 2, 2012, and the CBS's A Home for the Holidays on December 19, 2012.

Phillip has performed on The Today Show and Good Morning America Concert Series, Late Show with David Letterman, Jimmy Kimmel Live!, The Tonight Show With Jay Leno, The Ellen DeGeneres Show, Live With Kelly, The View, and Conan. He has also appeared at the American Music Awards and Billboard Music Awards.

Phillip Phillips made the Forbes Highest Earning American Idol list for each of the three years he was qualified. For the list published in January 2014 and January 2015, he ranked number three.  For the list published January 2016, he ranked number four.

2012–2013: The World from the Side of the Moon
Phillip Phillips released his debut album, The World from the Side of the Moon, on November 19, 2012.  The album was produced by Gregg Wattenberg, with Phillips writing or co-writing the majority of the disc.  On November 6, 2012, "Where We Came From"  was released for sale in advance of the album, and was a free download on pre-orders. The album debuted at No. 4 in the Billboard 200 with sales of 169,000 copies, and was certified Platinum by RIAA in August 2013. The World From The Side Of The Moon was on the Billboard Top 200 album chart for 61 weeks. That puts in number two of all the debut albums by American Idol winners.

In January 2013, Phillip Phillips appeared on the cover of Billboard magazine with Interscope Records founder and CEO and American Idol mentor, Jimmy Iovine. "Phillip is a true artist and the fact that people are embracing his album shows they accept him as an artist." said Iovine.

On January 29, 2013, Phillips began a tour in North America as the opening act for Matchbox Twenty. He also headlined ten college dates in January with a four-piece acoustic band, and a further college tour with an electric band from March through May after his tour with Matchbox Twenty.  Nine of his college tour dates were postponed due to a continuing health issue.

From July 6 to October 5, 2013, he toured as the opening act for John Mayer's Born and Raised World Tour, followed by his own college tour and then further dates with John Mayer until December 17. He also performed at the international music festival Rock in Rio, in Rio de Janeiro on September 21, the same day as John Mayer and Bruce Springsteen.  In 2014, a solo tour of Canada was also scheduled, as well as other dates in the US.

The third single released from the album was "Where We Came From".

"Gone, Gone, Gone" from the album was released as a single on February 11, 2013. Phillips performed the song live on the March 14, 2013 edition of American Idol.  "Gone, Gone, Gone" was also used as the twelfth season's "send-off" song, played as the backing track for the montages that highlight each week's eliminated finalist. The song was also used in the film, The Amazing Spider-Man 2.

Phillip Phillips capped off 2013 with a nomination from the American Music Awards for Best New Artist.  He joined Kelly Clarkson and Carrie Underwood as the only American Idol winners to receive this nomination.

2014–2019: Behind the Light, Collateral and acting

In March 2013, Phillip Phillips stated that he was "always writing" and that his second studio album would be released sometime in 2014. The album, Behind the Light, was released on May 19, 2014. The debut single, "Raging Fire", from his second album was released digitally on March 3, 2014. The song was featured in the National Hockey League's Playoffs. Phillips received his first BMI pop music song writing award for "Raging Fire".  A promotional single, "Fly", was released alongside the album's pre-order on April 22, 2014.

Phillips toured with O.A.R. in the summer of 2014. He also launched the Behind The Light Fall Tour 2014 in the U.S. to support his second album.

The second single released from the album was "Unpack Your Heart". The song was featured in a TV commercial for Ram 1500 trucks, which premiered at the 2014 American Music Awards.

In January 2015, Phillips filed a lawsuit against his label 19 Recordings, seeking to be released from his contract". The dispute was settled in June 2017.

On April 7, 2016 Phillip Phillips returned to the American Idol stage for the series finale and performed a tribute to David Bowie with four other  winners; David Cook, Kris Allen, Lee Dewyze, and Nick Fradiani. Former Idol judge Simon Cowell said Phillip Phillips was the only contestant he liked after he left the show. Jennifer Lopez, who was a judge on the eleventh season, revealed that Phillips is her favorite American Idol winner.

He performed at the 2016 Invictus Games closing ceremony in Orlando, Florida on May 12, 2016.

On June 17, 2016, Phillips started a co-headlining tour with Matt Nathanson at the San Diego County Fair and ending on August 13 at the Wisconsin State Fair.

During summer 2017, Phillips was the opening act on the Live Nation Goo Goo Dolls' Long Way Home tour.

On October 18, 2017, Phillips performed at the CMT Artists of the Year awards, where he did a cover of Sam Hunt's "Body Like a Back Road", which won Song of the Year.

Phillips released the single "Miles" to radio on August 11, 2017, through 19R/Interscope. It was the lead single to the new album.

In January 2018, Phillips appeared in an episode of Hawaii Five-0, playing a diamond smuggler.

Phillips' third studio album, Collateral was released January 19, 2018. Producer Ryan Hadlock has been Phillips' primary collaborator, and he also worked with Nathan Chapman, Jon Nite, John Paul White and Todd Clark, with whom he wrote the singles "Gone, Gone, Gone" and "Raging Fire". He performed "The Magnetic Tour" from February 9, 2018 to April 14, 2018 with over 40 shows to support the album.

In the summer of 2018, Phillips hit the road headlining his solo tour and a co-headlining tour with Gavin DeGraw including over 30 shows.

In September 2019, Phillips teamed with American Authors and Maddie Poppe on a new version of the song "Bring It on Home".

2020 - present: Return to American Idol and touring
On May 3, 2020, Phillip Phillips returned to American Idol and opened the Top 10 by performing "Home". The episode "On with the Show: Homeward Bound" featured the theme of songs about home. The show was broadcast from homes of the participants due to the pandemic health crisis.

Phillips performed on the Idol alumni ensemble (including Alejandro Aranda, Fantasia, Gabby Barrett, Jordin Sparks, Katharine McPhee, Kellie Pickler, Laine Hardy, Lauren Alaina, Ruben Studdard and Scotty McCreery) for "We Are the World" with Lionel Richie on the season finale on May 17, 2020.

Phillips performed at pandemic relief efforts for Sendero Together for Texas  and for the Phoebe Hospital Foundation to help support frontline medical heroes battling COVID-19 in southwest Georgia.

On July 17, 2021, Phillips performed "Home" in support of the Project Angel Food telethon. The telethon help raise $1M to sustain the expanded service to those in need, preparing and delivering over one million medically tailored meals.

On April 17, 2022, Phillips returned to the 20th anniversary of American Idol  to perform his new single "Love Like That". It was also his tenth year anniversary since winning the show.

In the Fall of 2022, Phillips hit the road headlining his Where We Came From tour with guest American Authors.

Personal life
Phillips has suffered from a congenital kidney condition.  Soon after American Idol finished, he had large kidney stones removed and underwent reconstructive surgery on his kidney.

On December 26, 2014, Phillip Phillips announced his engagement to girlfriend Hannah Blackwell.  The two were married at the Resora Plantation in Albany, Georgia, on October 24, 2015.

On July 3, 2019, Phillips and Blackwell announced that they were expecting their first child, a son, in the fall. Patch Shepherd Phillips was born November 10, 2019.

Phillip Phillips has supported organizations including the Sarah Foundation and the Gibson Flood Relief Campaign. as well being an ambassador for Brave Beginnings.  He has also supported DoSomething, National Park Foundation, NCIRE - the Veterans Health Research Institute, Save The Music Foundation, and Habitat for Humanity.

Discography 

 The World from the Side of the Moon (2012)
 Behind the Light (2014)
 Collateral (2018)

Filmography

Concert Tours 
 American Idol Tour Summer 2012
 College Tour Spring 2013
 North Tour (2013) with Matchbox Twenty
 Born and Raised World Tour (2013) with John Mayer
 Canada Tour Spring 2014
 With O.A.R. Summer Tour 2014
 Behind The Light Fall Tour 2014
 With Matt Nathanson Summer 2016
 Long Way Home Tour (2017) with Goo Goo Dolls
 The Magnetic Tour Spring 2018
 With Gavin DeGraw Summer 2018
 Jingle Bell Rock Tour Winter 2018
 Where We Came From Tour with American Authors Fall 2022

Awards and nominations

See also
List of Idols winners

References

External links
 
 PhillPhill.com
 Phillip Phillips on American Idol
 

1990 births
Living people
19 Recordings artists
21st-century American singers
American Idol winners
American folk singers
American male singer-songwriters
American pop guitarists
American pop rock singers
American rock guitarists
American male guitarists
American rock songwriters
American male actors
Interscope Records artists
Musicians from Albany, Georgia
People from Leesburg, Georgia
21st-century American guitarists
Guitarists from Georgia (U.S. state)
21st-century American male singers
Singer-songwriters from Georgia (U.S. state)